Playland Amusement Park is an amusement park in Vancouver, British Columbia, Canada. The amusement park is located at Hastings Park and is operated by the Pacific National Exhibition (PNE), an organization that hosts an annual summer fair and exhibition adjacent to Playland. Playland opened at its current location in 1958, although its predecessor, Happyland, operated at Hastings Park from 1929 to 1957. Playland was formally made a division of the PNE in 1993. 

Playland operates seasonally, opening from May to September every year. The park also reopens in October for its annual "Fright Nights" Halloween themed events. As of 2018, the park operated 39 attractions, including three roller coasters. Additional rides are brought in from West Coast Amusements during the PNE's annual summer fair from mid-August to Labour Day; nearly doubling the number of rides at the park.

History

Predecessor
The Pacific National Exhibition (PNE) has hosted a number of amusement rides since it opened in 1910; with an early roller coaster installed in 1915. However, a permanent amusement complex was not built until the 1920s. Built at Hastings Park, several rides were opened by 1926, including a Shoot the Chute ride and a new roller coaster, the Giant Dipper, to replace the one built in 1915. 

Although the first rides were opened by 1926, Playland's predecessor, Happyland, did not fully open for its first regular season until 1929. Happyland was operated by several companies while it was open, including the British Columbia Amusement Company; and the Pacific Amusement Company. The park continued to operate until 1957, when amusement park operations were moved to its present location. The original site was demolished after the amusement park's relocation; with the site later being used for Pacific Coliseum.

Playland

Construction for the modern amusement park occurred from December 1957 to 1958, with the park opening in time for that year's PNE exhibition. Reopened as Playland, the park featured several new attractions including the Wooden Roller Coaster, the country's largest at the time of its opening.

Although it was located adjacent to the PNE's fairgrounds, the amusement park did not formally become a division of the Pacific National Exhibition until January 1993.

In 2001, the park begain operating Halloween-themed events or "Fright Nights" during the month of October. During this time, haunted houses are set up inside the amusement park and employed monsters are roaming the park scaring patrons. Most of the parks regular amusement rides are in operation. The haunted houses have been owned and managed by ScreamWorks Inc., a Calgary-based company. Fright Nights event and its including the haunted houses were managed by the PNE and Playland beginning in 2009.

In 2009, the Wooden Roller Coaster was designated with "classic" and "landmark" status by the American Coaster Enthusiasts.

Attractions

As of 2018, Playland is home to 39 attractions. Interactive attractions at Playland including a climbing wall, face painting, the Glass House funhouse, and mini golf. Playland also has a haunted house attraction and shooting gallery, although these attractions are not included in the park's admission fee and require an additional fee for entry. 

The amusement park also has an arcade and a number of carnival games; including a balloon popping darts game, ring toss, Skee-Ball, and Whac-A-Mole.

In addition to interactive attractions, the park also holds a number of amusement rides, including three roller coasters. In November 2022, the PNE announced it acquired a launched roller coaster from Zamperla for $9-million. The amusement park plans to open the new roller coaster in 2024.

Past attractions

Past attractions at Playland included the "Nintendo Power Zone", an area where guests could play the latest games for Nintendo and PlayStation video game consoles; and a maze built out of covered chain link fencing. Corkscrewe was the last roller coaster removed from the amusement park, closing in 2018.

Temporary rides
In addition to the permanent rides installed at the amusement park, West Coast Amusements (WCA) also brings in temporary rides to Hastings Park for the PNE's annual fair from mid-late August to early September. WCA operates a travelling carnival circuit whose inventory includes over 100 amusement rides such as Ferris Wheels, Hurricane, Music Express, and Scrambler. However, the lineup of rides that the WCA brings to the PNE varies from year-to-year.

Film setting
The amusement park has been used for the filming of several films. The 1999 Canadian teen-drama film Rollercoaster, was shot at the park. The opening scenes of the horror film Final Destination 3 were also shot at the park, utilizing the now-retired Corkscrew roller coaster, seen in the film as "Devil's Flight", and the Hellevator tower as "High Dive". Diary of a Wimpy Kid: Dog Days was filmed at Playland for the boardwalk scene, where the Corkscrew and The Revelation (“Cranium Shaker” in the movie) rotating arm ride were shown along with many smaller rides. The Nickelodeon original movie Splitting Adam was also filmed at Playland's water park. The 2010 film Cats & Dogs: The Revenge of Kitty Galore was also filmed at Playland, highlighting the now-retired Wave Swinger ride. The 1996 film, Fear was shot there in the summer of 1995. In 2016, The Edge of Seventeen starting Hailee Steinfeld filmed a scene with co-star Hayden Szeto featuring the Westcoast Wheel and mini-golf course along with the background scenery in screen.

Notes

References

Further reading

External links

Playland at the Roller Coaster DataBase

1929 establishments in British Columbia
Amusement parks in Canada
Amusement parks opened in 1929
Buildings and structures in Vancouver
Culture of Vancouver
Hastings Park
Tourist attractions in Vancouver